Overlooked may refer to:
Overlooked (album), by Caroline's Spine
Overlooked (obituary feature), a recurring feature published in The New York Times

See also 
Overlook (disambiguation)